Nine Lives is the eighth studio album by REO Speedwagon. It peaked at number #33 on the Billboard 200 chart in 1979. The album went gold on December 5, 1979. The title Nine Lives was chosen because the album was the band's ninth, including their live album, and it also featured nine songs. It was the last REO album to prominently feature a more hard rock sound. The group would turn to more pop-oriented material with 1980's Hi Infidelity. In 2013, the album was released on CD by UK-based company Rock Candy Records, with expanded liner notes and photos.

The track "Only the Strong Survive" also later appeared on Gary Richrath's 1992 album Only the Strong Survive.  Record World said of the single release of "Only the Strong Survive" that it "rips and roars with typical REO flash."

Record World said of the single "Easy Money" that "The verse builds into a roaring chorus that's an AOR standard."

Track listing

Personnel
REO Speedwagon
Kevin Cronin – lead vocals, rhythm guitar
Gary Richrath – lead guitar
Neal Doughty – keyboards
Bruce Hall – bass, backing vocals 
Alan Gratzer – drums, backing vocals

Additional personnel
Bill Champlin – backing vocals
Steve Forman – percussion
Tom Kelly – backing vocals

Production
Producers: Kevin Cronin, Gary Richrath, Kevin Beamish
Engineers: Kevin Beamish, Gary Lubow
Arranger: Kevin Cronin
Associate Producer: Alan Gratzer
Production Assistance: Gary Lubow
Assistant engineers: Steve Williams, D. C. Snyder
Direction: John Baruck, Alex Kochan, Tom Consolo, JoAnn D'Agostino, Lynne Kirkwood
Art direction: Tom Drennon
Design: Tom Drennon, Ginger Canzoneri
Cover photographer: John Bilecky
Center spread and portrait photography: Neal Preston
Back cover cat illustrations: Ginger Canzoneri
Models: Candy Moore, Lindy Thorp, Shyanne Rippee, Karen Bilecky

Charts

Album

Certifications

Release history

References

REO Speedwagon albums
1979 albums
Epic Records albums
Albums produced by Kevin Beamish
Albums produced by Gary Richrath
Albums produced by Kevin Cronin